Pediasia nephelostictus is a moth in the family Crambidae. It was described by Joseph de Joannis in 1927. It is found in Mozambique.

References

Crambini
Moths described in 1927
Insects of Mozambique
Moths of Sub-Saharan Africa
Endemic fauna of Mozambique